Luis M. Campos is an Associate Professor in the Department of Chemistry at Columbia University. Campos leads a research team focused on nanostructured materials, macromolecular systems, and single-molecule electronics.

Early life and career 
Campos was born in Guadalajara, Mexico. He remained in his hometown until the age of 11, where he moved to Los Angeles, California.

Campos attended California State University, Dominguez Hills, graduating with a B.Sc. in chemistry in 2001. After completing his undergraduate degree, Campos conducted research at King’s College London on theoretical organic photochemistry 

Campos attended the University of California, Los Angeles (UCLA) as a graduate student, where he worked under Prof. Miguel García-Garibay and Prof. Kendall Houk’s supervision. During his doctoral studies, Campos also performed research at the University of Minnesota with Prof. Donald G. Truhlar during the summer of 2003, and at the Johannes Kepler University Linz in Austria with Prof. Niyazi Serdar Sarıçiftçi in 2004 and 2005. Campos was awarded an NSF Predoctoral Fellowship, a Paul & Daisy Soros Fellowship, and the Saul & Silvia Winstein Award during his graduate studies. He received a Ph.D. from the Department of Chemistry and Biochemistry in 2006.

Campos then conducted postdoctoral research from 2006 to 2010 at the University of California, Santa Barbara, where he worked with polymer chemist Prof. Craig Hawker on functionalization and cross-linking of polymers using the thiol-ene reaction.

Campos has started his independent academic career in 2011 as an Assistant Professor in the Columbia University Department of Chemistry. In 2016, he was promoted to Associate Professor.

Research
Campos research group explores molecular, macromolecular, and nanostructured materials that allow for advanced functional systems to be formed. The group is trained to adjust such materials using molecular design. Campos’ main strategy is to be able to understand a structure in order to better produce materials to help advance biology, engineering, physics, and processing.

Nanostructured materials
Nanostructured materials deal with block copolymers and assembles themselves. Campos and colleagues developed copolymers that can self-assemble into different nanoparticles. The research aspires to develop a light-weight, energy efficient devices from the polymers by understanding how to control architecture of these block copolymers.

Molecular and macromolecular systems

Campos and colleagues also work on the development of chemistry for the next generation solar cell technologies. Specifically, they have made several important contributions to making singlet fission materials that can create triplet pairs. By controlling the molecular structure of the organic molecules they synthesize, the physical properties of the molecules can be manipulated. This material is utilized to generate parts required for organic photovoltaics.

Single-molecule electronics

Studies involving single-molecule transport demonstrate how particular designs lead the synthesis of macromolecular materials. This also allows for chemists to adjust the functionality of a chemical. This research allows for exceptional transport technology.

Awards and honors

Campos has received recognition for his academic work. He has received several awards throughout his post-graduate career. Such awards include the 2016 ACS Arthur C. Cope Scholar Award, 2016 C&E News Talented 12, 2016 Camille Dreyfus Teacher-Scholar Award, 2015 ONR Young Investigator Award, 2015 Cottrell Scholar Award, and the 2014 NSF CAREER Award. He has served as an associate editor of the journal Chemical Science since 2018.

References

External links 
 

21st-century American chemists
Nanomaterials
Columbia University faculty
California State University, Dominguez Hills alumni
University of California, Los Angeles alumni
Year of birth missing (living people)
Living people
People from Guadalajara, Jalisco
Mexican chemists
Organic chemists